is a programme sponsored by the Agency for Cultural Affairs, aimed at valorization by local governments and other bodies, that sees individual Cultural Properties across the different categories as well as other not yet designated assets grouped together into thematic "stories" that the Agency then designates as "Japan Heritage". The first such was designated in 2015 and as of June 2020 there were one hundred and four of these narratives.

List of Japan Heritage

See also
 List of World Heritage Sites in Japan
 Cultural Properties of Japan
 Hokkaidō Heritage

References

External links
 Japan Heritage

Cultural Properties of Japan
Cultural history of Japan
Cultural heritage